Alstone may refer to:
Alstone, Cheltenham, Gloucestershire, England
Alstone, Somerset, England
Alstone, Tewkesbury, Gloucestershire, England

See also 
Alston (disambiguation)